Hebron District School No. 16, also known as the Munson Hollow School, District School No. 12, and District School No. 2, is a historic one-room school building located at East Hebron, Washington County, New York. It was built about 1847, and is a one-story, rectangular, building with modest Greek Revival style design elements.  It has a moderately pitched gable roof and is of stacked plant construction with a slate foundation.  It housed a school until 1944, after which it was used as a community center.

It was added to the National Register of Historic Places in 2012.

References

One-room schoolhouses in New York (state)
School buildings on the National Register of Historic Places in New York (state)
Greek Revival architecture in New York (state)
School buildings completed in 1794
Schools in Washington County, New York
National Register of Historic Places in Washington County, New York
1794 establishments in New York (state)